The Temple of Matidia was a Roman temple on the Campus Martius in ancient Rome dedicated to Salonia Matidia, who was deified after her death in 119 by her son-in-law Hadrian. He began construction immediately after her deification, choosing a site near the Pantheon and the Saepta Julia, both of which he restored or rebuilt. A lead water pipe inscribed 'templo matidiae' ('from the temple of Matidia') was found near Sant'Ignazio, which may indicate the temple's location. After Hadrian died and was deified, his own temple was built next to that of Matidia.

See also
List of Ancient Roman temples

Bibliography
L. Richardson, jr, A New Topographical Dictionary of Ancient Rome, Baltimore - London 1992. pp. 246–247 
F. Coarelli, Rome and environs - an archeological guide, Berkeley 2007. pp. 291–292 

Matidia
Hadrianic building projects
110s establishments in the Roman Empire
Roman temples of the Imperial cult